John Mervyn Addison (16 March 19207 December 1998) was a British composer best known for his film scores.

Early life
Addison was born in Chobham, Surrey to a father who was a colonel in the Royal Field Artillery, and this influenced the decision to send him to school at Wellington College, Berkshire. His grandfather was Lieut-Colonel George Addison, who played for the Royal Engineers in the 1872 and 1874 FA Cup Finals.

At the age of sixteen he entered the Royal College of Music, where he studied composition with Gordon Jacob, oboe with Léon Goossens, and clarinet with Frederick Thurston. This education ended in 1939 with service in World War II. Addison served with the British XXX Corps in the 23rd Hussars. He was a tank officer in the Battle of Normandy and wounded at Caen, later participating in Operation Market Garden. Addison would later write the score for the film A Bridge Too Far about the operation. At the end of the war, he returned to London to teach composition at the Royal College of Music.

Career
Addison is best known for his film scores. He won an Academy Award for Best Original Score and a Grammy Award in the Best Original Score from a Motion Picture or Television Show category for the music to the 1963 film, Tom Jones. He also won a BAFTA Award for A Bridge Too Far (1977). His other film scores included A Taste of Honey (1961), Smashing Time (1967), The Honey Pot (1967), Sleuth (1972), Swashbuckler (1976) and the television series Centennial (1978).

He composed the theme music for the television series Murder, She Wrote, and won an Emmy for the 2-hour pilot episode in the Outstanding Achievement in Music Composition for a Series (dramatic underscore) category. Addison will also be remembered as the composer Alfred Hitchcock turned to when the director ended his long relationship with Bernard Herrmann over the score to his 1966 film Torn Curtain, although Addison was not hired for any of his other films.

He had a personal connection to Reach for the Sky (1956) which he scored, since Douglas Bader (the subject of the movie) was his brother-in-law, having married Addison's elder sister Thelma.

For the theatre, Addison wrote the music for John Osborne's plays The Entertainer (1957) and Luther (1961). He collaborated with John Cranko on a revue, "Cranks" in 1956.

Although he wrote numerous classical compositions, Addison explained that "If you find you're good at something, as I was as a film composer, it's stupid to do anything else." His classical works included the Concerto for trumpet, strings and percussion (1949), described by The Times as "buoyant" and "Gershwinesque"; a trio for oboe, clarinet and bassoon; Carte Blanche, a ballet for Sadler's Wells first performed at the 1953 Edinburgh Festival from which an orchestral suite of "sophisticated high spirits" was performed at the Proms; a septet for wind and harp, a piano concerto, a concertante for oboe, clarinet, horn and orchestra; and a partita for strings, which was warmly praised.

Marlene Dietrich recorded If He Swing By the String and Such Trying Times from the music in Tom Jones.

Addison's collection of correspondence, scores, and studio recordings were donated to the Film Music Archives at Brigham Young University in 1994. He was survived by his wife Pamela; two sons Jonathan and Daniel; daughter Lucinda; stepson Rex Birchenough, and stepdaughter Sandra Stapleton. His daughter Jane pre-deceased him.

Film scores

1950 Seven Days to Noon
1951 High Treason
 1951 Pool of London
 1952 The Hour of 13
 1953 The Man Between
1953 Terror on a Train
1953 The Red Beret
1954 The Maggie
1954 The Black Knight
1954 Make Me an Offer
 1955 The Cockleshell Heroes
 1956 Private's Progress
 1956 Reach for the Sky
1956 Three Men in a Boat
1957 The Shiralee
1957 Lucky Jim
1957 Barnacle Bill
1958 I Was Monty's Double
1959 Carlton-Browne of the F.O.
 1960 School for Scoundrels 
 1960 The Entertainer 
1960 A French Mistress
 1960 His and Hers 
 1961 A Taste of Honey 
1962 Go to Blazes
1962 The Loneliness of the Long Distance Runner
 1963 Girl in the Headlines
 1963 Tom Jones
1964 Girl with Green Eyes
1964 Guns at Batasi
 1964 The Peaches
 1965 The Amorous Adventures of Moll Flanders
1965 The Loved One
1965 The Uncle
1966 I Was Happy Here
1966 A Fine Madness
 1966 Torn Curtain
 1967 The Honey Pot 
 1967 Smashing Time 
 1968 The Charge of the Light Brigade
1970 Start the Revolution Without Me
1970 Country Dance
1971 Mr. Forbush and the Penguins
1972 Sleuth
1973 Luther
1974 Dead Cert
1975 Ride a Wild Pony
1976 Swashbuckler
1976 The Seven-Per-Cent Solution 
1977 A Bridge Too Far
1977 Joseph Andrews
1980 The Pilot
1982 Highpoint
1983 Strange Invaders
1985 Grace Quigley
1985 Code Name: Emerald

Music composed for TV

 1990 The Phantom of the Opera (miniseries)
 1988 A Shadow on the Sun
 1987 Strange Voices 
 1986-1987 Walt Disney's Wonderful World of Color (2 episodes) 
 1986 Amazing Stories (2 episodes) 
 1986 Something in Common 
 1986 Dead Man's Folly 
 1985 Thirteen at Dinner 
 1984 Ellis Island 
 1984 Murder, She Wrote (1 episode) 
 1982 I Was a Mail Order Bride 
 1982 The Devlin Connection
 1982 Charles & Diana: A Royal Love Story 
 1982 Eleanor, First Lady of the World 
 1981 Mistress of Paradise
 1981 Nero Wolfe (14 episodes) 
 1979 The French Atlantic Affair 
 1979 Love's Savage Fury
 1979 The Power Within 
 1979 Like Normal People
 1978 Centennial (12 episodes) 
 1978 Pearl 
 1978 The Eddie Capra Mysteries (1 episode)
 1978 The Bastard 
 1978 Black Beauty
 1975 Grady (2 episodes) 
 1975 A Journey to London 
 1974 Bellamira
 1974 Play for Today (1 episode) 
 1970 ITV Sunday Night Theatre (1 episode) (Hamlet)
 1964 Detective (1 episode)

Notes

References
 Obituary, The Guardian, 15 December 1998

External links
 
 
 John Addison papers, MSS 2165, L. Tom Perry Special Collections, Harold B. Lee Library, Brigham Young University
 John Addison biography and credits at BFI Screenonline

1920 births
1998 deaths
Military personnel from Surrey
Best Original Music BAFTA Award winners
Best Original Music Score Academy Award winners
Primetime Emmy Award winners
Grammy Award winners
English film score composers
English male film score composers
People from Chobham, Surrey
People educated at Wellington College, Berkshire
British Army personnel of World War II
23rd Hussars officers
Alumni of the Royal College of Music
20th-century classical musicians
20th-century English composers
20th-century British male musicians
20th-century British musicians
Varèse Sarabande Records artists